Gintaras Einikis (born September 30, 1969) is a Lithuanian retired professional basketball player and current coach. He stands at 6 ft 10 in (208 cm), and is a former center for the senior Lithuanian national team. Einikis is the only player from the Lithuanian national team to have won all three consecutive bronze medals at the Summer Olympics, in Barcelona, Atlanta, and Sydney.

Professional career
In 1987, the then 18-year-old Einikis, arrived at Žalgiris, to replace his injured teammate, Arvydas Sabonis. Einikis established himself as a strong and aggressive defender, an excellent center, and a surprisingly accurate three-point shooter. When Sabonis left Žalgiris, Einikis continued his career, as a starter.

In 1995, Einikis joined Avtodor Saratov. After dominating with Avtodor, Einikis then moved to CSKA Moscow. After 2 moderate seasons with CSKA, he moved to Idea-Slask, where he averaged 9 points per game, and 4.4 rebounds per game, in 22 minutes per game of EuroLeague action. After a tumultuous first half of the season, he left Śląsk and signed with Greek side Near East to finish the season.

He then moved back to Zalgiris, where he contributed more to the team. During the last years of his career, his averages fell drastically; however, he still helped Lietuvos Rytas to win the ULEB Cup (EuroCup) championship in 2005. He retired after the 2005–06 season.

In 2009, he returned to playing professional basketball, and played for Naglis-Adakris. After the 2009–10 season, he retired for a second time.

Career statistics

EuroLeague

|-
| style="text-align:left;"| 2001–02
| style="text-align:left;"| Wrocław
| 9 || 7 || 22.1 || .437 || .182 || .765 || 4.4 || .8 || .6 || .6 || 9.0 || 6.9
|-
| style="text-align:left;"| 2002–03
| style="text-align:left;"| Žalgiris
| 14 || 12 || 26.0 || .530 || .444 || .750 || 4.9 || .6 || .7 || .4 || 13.0 || 10.9
|-
| style="text-align:left;"| 2004–05
| style="text-align:left;"| Unicaja
| 8 || 1 || 10.0 || .563 || .222 || .500 || 1.4 || .0 || .3 || .1 || 3.1 || 2.3

Coaching career
On February 10, 2016, it was announced that Einkis had become an assistant coach for Avtodor Saratov.

Controversies
In 2008, Einikis participated in altercation with a night club's staff, yelling insults, threatening physical harm and refusing to leave the club. He and his friend were fined with 3,000 Litas.

After the incident, Einikis was spotted leaving the club in his car Volkswagen Touareg. Because he had lost his license a year ago after his involvement in a hit and run accident, he was fined with an additional 2,500 Litas. During the accident, it was speculated that he was on cocaine. The police discovered cocaine powder in his car.

In 2011, Einikis, heavily intoxicated, with 5.11 per mil blood-alcohol concentration, went to his friend's house and threatened to kill her by setting her house on fire. He was later arrested and charged with threats of arson and assault.

He married his longtime friend Jurgita in July 2012. Later that month, however, he, while under the influence of alcohol, physically assaulted his wife.

Awards and achievements

Pro clubs
6× Lithuanian Champion: (1991, 1992, 1993, 1994, 1995, 2003)
Lithuanian SSR Champion: (1991)
2× Lithuanian Champion: (1992, 1993)
3× Lithuanian League (LKL) Champion: (1994, 1995, 2003)
2× Lithuanian League MVP: (1994, 1995)
2× Lithuanian League Finals MVP: (1994, 1995)
FIBA EuroStar: (1997)
Russian League Champion: (2000)
Polish League Champion: (2004)
ULEB Cup (EuroCup) Champion: (2005)
FIBA EuroCup All-Star (FIBA EuroChallenge All-Star): (2006)
Czech League Champion: (2006)

Lithuanian senior national team
1992 Summer Olympics: 
EuroBasket 1995: 
1996 Summer Olympics: 
2000 Summer Olympics:

References

External links
Eurobasket.com Profile
Basket Stats Profile

1969 births
Living people
Asseco Gdynia players
Baloncesto Málaga players
Basketball players at the 1992 Summer Olympics
Basketball players at the 1996 Summer Olympics
Basketball players at the 2000 Summer Olympics
BC Avtodor Saratov players
BC Rytas players
BC Žalgiris players
Centers (basketball)
Liga ACB players
Lithuanian expatriate basketball people in Poland
Lithuanian expatriate basketball people in Russia
Lithuanian expatriate basketball people in Spain
Lithuanian men's basketball players
Medalists at the 1992 Summer Olympics
Medalists at the 1996 Summer Olympics
Medalists at the 2000 Summer Olympics
Olympic basketball players of Lithuania
Olympic bronze medalists for Lithuania
Olympic medalists in basketball
PBC CSKA Moscow players
Power forwards (basketball)
Soviet men's basketball players
Sportspeople from Kretinga
1998 FIBA World Championship players
Lithuanian expatriate basketball people in the Czech Republic